Miletus (Ancient Greek: Μίλητος) was a character from Greek mythology, the eponymous mythical founder of the city of Miletus.

Etymology 
According to Robert Graves, Miletus' name tentatively suggests "red earth" miltos referring to the fact that Cretans had a complexion that was redder than that of the Greeks.

Family 
Miletus was son of Apollo and Areia, nymph-daughter of Cleochus, of Crete. His mother in other accounts was Acacallis, a daughter of Minos who consorted with Apollo. Yet another source calls Miletus' mother Deïone, and himself by the matronymic Deionides. Finally, one source gives Miletus as the son of Euxantius, himself son of Minos by a Telchinian woman Dexithea.

Miletus married either Eidothea, daughter of King Eurytus of Caria, or Tragasia, daughter of Celaenus, or Cyane, daughter of the river god Maeander, or Areia, and by her had a son Kaunos (Caunus) and a daughter Byblis.

A different family of Miletus was given by Nonnus, his father was Asterius, son of Minos and Androgenia while Caunus and Byblis became his siblings instead of his children.

Mythology 
When Areia gave birth to her son she hid him in a bed of Smilax; Cleochus found the child there and named him Miletus after the plant. In the tradition in which his mother was Acacallis, the daughter of Minos, fearing her father's wrath, exposed the child, but Apollo commanded the she-wolves to come down and nurse the child.

He was loved by both Minos and Sarpedon, but showed preference for the latter, and this became the reason why Sarpedon was expelled from Crete by his brother. Following the advice of Sarpedon, Miletus with an army also left Crete for Samos, then moved to Caria and became the mythical founder and eponym of the city of Miletus. Myths further relate that the hero Miletus founded the city only after slaying Asterius, son of Anax; and that the region known as Miletus was originally called 'Anactoria'.

Notes

References 

 Antoninus Liberalis, The Metamorphoses of Antoninus Liberalis translated by Francis Celoria (Routledge 1992). Online version at the Topos Text Project.
 Apollodorus, The Library with an English Translation by Sir James George Frazer, F.B.A., F.R.S. in 2 Volumes, Cambridge, MA, Harvard University Press; London, William Heinemann Ltd. 1921. ISBN 0-674-99135-4. Online version at the Perseus Digital Library. Greek text available from the same website.
 Conon, Fifty Narrations, surviving as one-paragraph summaries in the Bibliotheca (Library) of Photius, Patriarch of Constantinople translated from the Greek by Brady Kiesling. Online version at the Topos Text Project.
 Nonnus of Panopolis, Dionysiaca translated by William Henry Denham Rouse (1863-1950), from the Loeb Classical Library, Cambridge, MA, Harvard University Press, 1940.  Online version at the Topos Text Project.
 Nonnus of Panopolis, Dionysiaca. 3 Vols. W.H.D. Rouse. Cambridge, MA., Harvard University Press; London, William Heinemann, Ltd. 1940-1942. Greek text available at the Perseus Digital Library.
 Parthenius, Love Romances translated by Sir Stephen Gaselee (1882-1943), S. Loeb Classical Library Volume 69. Cambridge, MA. Harvard University Press. 1916.  Online version at the Topos Text Project.
 Parthenius, Erotici Scriptores Graeci, Vol. 1. Rudolf Hercher. in aedibus B. G. Teubneri. Leipzig. 1858. Greek text available at the Perseus Digital Library.
 Pausanias, Description of Greece with an English Translation by W.H.S. Jones, Litt.D., and H.A. Ormerod, M.A., in 4 Volumes. Cambridge, MA, Harvard University Press; London, William Heinemann Ltd. 1918. . Online version at the Perseus Digital Library
 Pausanias, Graeciae Descriptio. 3 vols. Leipzig, Teubner. 1903.  Greek text available at the Perseus Digital Library.
 Publius Ovidius Naso, Metamorphoses translated by Brookes More (1859-1942). Boston, Cornhill Publishing Co. 1922. Online version at the Perseus Digital Library.
 Publius Ovidius Naso, Metamorphoses. Hugo Magnus. Gotha (Germany). Friedr. Andr. Perthes. 1892. Latin text available at the Perseus Digital Library.

Children of Apollo
Demigods in classical mythology
Cretan characters in Greek mythology
Anatolian characters in Greek mythology
Ionian mythology
Miletus
LGBT themes in Greek mythology
Fictional LGBT characters in literature